North Hampton is a town in Rockingham County, New Hampshire, United States. The population was 4,538 at the 2020 census. While the majority of the town is inland, North Hampton includes a part of New Hampshire's limited Atlantic seacoast.

History
First settled in 1639, the town was a part of Hampton known as "North Hill" or "North Parish".  Residents began petitioning for separation from Hampton as early as 1719, but township was not granted until 1742 by colonial governor Benning Wentworth, following separation of New Hampshire from Massachusetts.

Little Boar's Head, a seaside promontory, became a fashionable summer resort area in the 19th century, and contains elegant examples of late Victorian and Edwardian architecture.

Geography
The town is drained to the east by the Little River, which flows directly to the Atlantic Ocean, and to the northwest by the Winnicut River, which flows to Great Bay, which in turn reaches the Atlantic by way of the Piscataqua River.

U.S. Route 1 and state routes 1A and 151 run north–south through North Hampton, while 111 runs east–west. Interstate 95 runs through North Hampton without access to the town; Route 101 provides easier freeway access to North Hampton despite never entering the town. The nearest commercial airport is Portsmouth International Airport; the two closest major airports are Logan Airport in Boston and Portland International Jetport in Maine.

Adjacent municipalities
 Greenland, New Hampshire (north)
 Rye, New Hampshire (northeast)
 Hampton, New Hampshire (south)
 Exeter, New Hampshire (west at a single point)
 Stratham, New Hampshire (northwest)

Demographics

As of the census of 2000, there were 4,259 people, 1,671 households, and 1,234 families residing in the town.  The population density was 306.3 people per square mile (118.2/km2).  There were 1,782 housing units at an average density of 128.1 per square mile (49.5/km2).  The racial makeup of the town was 98.40% White, 0.31% African American, 0.05% Native American, 0.63% Asian, 0.21% from other races, and 0.40% from two or more races. Hispanic or Latino of any race were 0.77% of the population.

There were 1,671 households, out of which 29.8% had children under the age of 18 living with them, 64.6% were married couples living together, 7.0% had a female householder with no husband present, and 26.1% were non-families. 20.0% of all households were made up of individuals, and 8.3% had someone living alone who was 65 years of age or older.  The average household size was 2.55 and the average family size was 2.96.

In the town, the population was spread out, with 23.3% under the age of 18, 4.4% from 18 to 24, 27.4% from 25 to 44, 30.5% from 45 to 64, and 14.3% who were 65 years of age or older.  The median age was 42 years. For every 100 females, there were 95.3 males.  For every 100 females age 18 and over, there were 94.3 males.

The median income for a household in the town was $66,696, and the median income for a family was $72,500. Males had a median income of $51,451 versus $31,512 for females. The per capita income for the town was $34,187.  About 1.6% of families and 3.3% of the population were below the poverty line, including 0.7% of those under age 18 and 6.1% of those age 65 or over.

Notable people 

 Henry Dearborn (1751–1829), general, US congressman from Massachusetts; 5th US Secretary of War
 Abraham Drake (1715–1781), commanded 2nd N.H. Militia during Saratoga campaign
 Alvan T. Fuller (1878–1958), 50th governor of Massachusetts (summer residence)
 Ogden Nash (1902–1971), poet; buried in North Hampton
 Bonnie Newman (born 1945), politician
 Herbert Philbrick (1915–1993), Boston ad executive; noted Cold War citizen spy for the FBI

Thoroughbreds
 Mom's Command and Dancer's Image were notable Thoroughbreds owned by Peter D. Fuller at Runnymede Farm in North Hampton; the former horse is buried there. Both horses are featured on a billboard along NH Route 111.

Sites of interest

 Centennial Hall
 Drake Farm
 Fuller Gardens
 Little Boar's Head Historic District
 North Hampton State Beach
 North Hampton Town Hall
 Old North Hampton Library

References

External links
 
 North Hampton Public Library
 New Hampshire Economic and Labor Market Information Bureau Profile

 
Towns in Rockingham County, New Hampshire
Populated places established in 1639
Towns in New Hampshire
1639 establishments in the Thirteen Colonies
Populated coastal places in New Hampshire